Charles Neitzel  (April 1, 1853 – December 22, 1938) was an American farmer and politician.

Born in the town of Black Wolf, Wisconsin, Neitzel was a farmer. He was also involved with the People's Brewery Company, the Nekimi Fire Insurance Company, and the Triangle Manufacturing Company. He served as town treasurer and chairman. Neitzel also served on the school board. Neitzel served in the Wisconsin State Assembly, in 1907 and 1909, and was a Republican.

He died at his home in Oshkosh on December 22, 1938.

References

External links

1853 births
1938 deaths
People from Winnebago County, Wisconsin
Businesspeople from Wisconsin
Farmers from Wisconsin
School board members in Wisconsin
Mayors of places in Wisconsin
Republican Party members of the Wisconsin State Assembly